The 1938 UCLA Bruins football team represented the University of California, Los Angeles (UCLA) in the 1938 college football season. Coached by William H. Spaulding, the Bruins finished the season with a 7–4–1 record and made their first postseason appearance in a bowl game. The Bruins season offense scored 217 points while the defense allowed 106 points. George Pfeiffer and Hal Hirshon served as Co-Captains of the team. Center John Ryland was selected to the PCC First-Team All Coast and drafted by the Cleveland Rams of the National Football League (NFL) in 1939. The team also featured future Baseball Hall of Famer Jackie Robinson, Hollywood actor Woody Strode, Football Hall of Famer Kenny Washington. and Bill Overlin.

Schedule

1938 team players in the NFL
The following player was claimed in the 1939 NFL Draft.

Team member Jackie Robinson would go on to a career in Major League Baseball.

References

UCLA
UCLA Bruins football seasons
Poi Bowl champion seasons
UCLA Bruins football